Peacock Alley is a 1922 American silent drama film starring Monte Blue and Mae Murray. The film was directed by Murray's husband at the time, Robert Z. Leonard. An incomplete print survives at the Library of Congress.

Plot
As described in a film magazine, the board of directors for the main manufacturing company in the American village of Harmonville send young Elmer Harmon (Blue) to Paris to obtain a contract with the French government. In Paris Elmer meets the dancer Cleo of Paris (Murray), who casts aside her rich, would-be sweethearts and falls in love with him. When his business affairs appear hopeless, she helps him secure his contract, and the couple are married and return to Harmonville. A gala is given in Elmer's honor for having saved the village's prosperity, and citizens are shocked by Cleo's Parisian fashion. Elmer sells his interests and the couple move to New York City. To give Cleo the luxuries to which she is accustomed, Elmer in a moment of weakness forges his uncle's name and is arrested. Endeavoring to get Elmer out of trouble, Cleo returns to the stage, but in so doing she breaks a promise made to her husband. Elmer is released from jail after promising his uncle to have nothing more to do with Cleo, but then immediately tries to look her up. He finds her in what appears to be a compromising but innocent situation and decides the bad things that have been said about Cleo are true. He returns to Harmonville and the heartbroken Cleo returns to France and seeks seclusion in Normandy. Three years later Elmer finds Cleo there along with her little son who is named for him. They have a reconciliation.

Cast
Mae Murray as Cleo of Paris 
Monte Blue as Elmer Harmon 
Edmund Lowe as Phil Garrison 
William J. Ferguson as Alex Smith (credited as W.J. Ferguson) 
Anders Randolf as Hugo Fenton (credited as Anders Randolph) 
William H. Tooker as Joseph Carleton (credited as William Tooker) 
Howard Lang as Abner Harmon 
William Frederic as Mayor of Harmontown 
M. Durant as Monsieur Dubois 
Jeffreys Lewis as Toto 
Napoleon the Dog as Napoleon

Reception
The film was one of Murray's most successful films, and one of the biggest hits of 1922. The film was so successful it was the only silent film of Murray's that she remade as the "talkie" Peacock Alley, though major changes were made to the plot.

References

External links

Progressive Silent Film List: Peacock Alley at silentera.com

Lobby poster

1922 films
1922 drama films
Silent American drama films
American silent feature films
American black-and-white films
Films shot in New York City
Films set in Paris
Films directed by Robert Z. Leonard
Films with screenplays by Ouida Bergère
Tiffany Pictures films
Metro Pictures films
1920s American films